Stanislav Zippe  (born 20 January 1943 in Hořice) is a Czech artist, painter, sculptor and one of the leading representatives of kinetic art in Bohemia.

Biography 
Stanislav Zippe studied in art from 1957 – 1961. He deals mainly with creating sculptures and installations. He has been a member of several groups involved in arts activities creating kinetic sculptures, especially those that emphasize the relativity of space and using special effects such as crumbling in his works. In addition to creating sculptures and installations, he has also been involved in theater set design and creating geometric abstract paintings

See also
List of Czech painters

References

Czech sculptors
Czech male sculptors
Czech painters
Czech male painters
1943 births
Living people